Vidura College, Colombo (Sinhala: විදුර විද්‍යාලය) is a private English medium school in Colombo, Sri Lanka. Its founder and current principal is D.G. Sumanasekara.

History 
Vidura College was inaugurated on 27 January 1999, as a primary school, with the enrollment of six students to the Nursery and Grade 1 classes. Today the college conducts classes up to G.C.E. (Advanced Level) Examination, with a student population of over 2,700. Vidura is a test preparation center for GCE (Ordinary level and Advanced level) examinations – Dept. of examinations, Sri Lanka, University of Cambridge ESOL Examinations, UK (English for Speakers of Other Languages), Sri Lanka Festival of Music, Dance & Speech (IIMSD)

Sections 
The school is divided into five sections:
 Nursery School – Infant Group Play Group and Reception
 Primary School  – Grades 1 – 5
 Lower Secondary School – Grades 6 – 8
 Upper Secondary School – Grades 9 – 11
 High School – Grades 12 -13

College emblem 
The college logo symbolizes the goals envisaged by its founders:
Lotus buds symbolizes the students of Vidura
The Lamp symbolizes the knowledge imparted to the student
The Flame symbolizes the radiance of the student on graduation
The Pot symbolizes the fullness of personality developed
The Diamond symbolizes the part played by Vidura in making its work shine with brightness
  
The name "Vidura" means "vajra" ("the diamond").

Examinations 
After completing Grade 11 students sit the G.C.E. (Ordinary Level) Examination, Sri Lanka, as private candidates. Students proceeding further sit the G.C.E (Advanced Level) Examination, Sri Lanka after completing Grade 13.

References 

Educational institutions established in 1999
1999 establishments in Sri Lanka
Schools in Sri Jayawardenepura Kotte